Antonín Chráska (also Anton Chraska)  (3 October 1868, Horní Radechová, Austria-Hungary – 15 March 1953, Nové Město nad Metují, Czechoslovakia) was a Czech Protestant missionary, translator and theologian.

Chráska translated the Protestant Bible into Slovene  for the first time since the 1584 Dalmatian Bible.

Born into a family of weavers, Chráska decided to study theology at the age of 21. In 1897 he married and moved with his wife to Ljubljana, where he learned Slovene and began missionary work.

Chráska translated the Bible into Slovene for the British and Foreign Bible Society. The translation includes all the books of the Old and New Testaments, but not the Apocrypha. Published in 1914, the translation is entitled Sveto pismo Starega in Novega Zakona (The Bible of the Old and New Testaments).

Chráska lived with his family in Ljubljana until 1922, after which he returned to Czechoslovakia.  He died in 1953.

References

Citations
Chráska, Pavel and Fajfr, Daniel: Medallion for the 150th anniversary of the birth of preacher Antonín Chráska. Evangelický týdeník - Kostnické jiskry, 2018, vol. 103, No 26, p. 4.
Dvořáček, Bohumil: Evangelical Preacher Antonín Chráska. In: Rodným krajem - Vlastivědný sborník kraje Aloise Jiráska, Božena Němcová a bratří Čapků, č. 24, 2002, s. 30–32.

1868 births
1953 deaths
Translators of the Bible into Slovene
Czech theologians
People from Ljubljana
People from Náchod District
Czech Protestant missionaries
Missionary linguists